Dave Grohl is an American singer, songwriter, and musician whose discography consists of 16 studio albums, six live albums, eight compilation albums, six EPs, and four soundtracks, and also includes his other collaborations and work as a studio musician with 26 additional artists. A large portion of his releases have come as the drummer of Nirvana (1990–1994) and as the frontman of Foo Fighters (1995–present).

Grohl began playing music in the 1980s and was a member of Freak Baby, whose name was later changed to Mission Impossible after Grohl switched from guitarist to drummer. The band recorded demos under both names and released a split EP with Lünch Meat, originally issued as Thanks (1986), later retitled Getting Shit for Growing Up Different. After some lineup changes, Mission Impossible became Dain Bramage and released I Scream Not Coming Down (1986) before breaking up when Grohl auditioned for Scream and became the band's drummer.

With Scream, Grohl released No More Censorship (1988), two live albums and the posthumous release, Fumble (1993), recorded shortly before the group's dissolution in 1990. Later that year, Grohl was put in contact with Kurt Cobain and Krist Novoselic who were in search of a new drummer for their band Nirvana. After a successful tryout, Grohl joined the band and recorded Nevermind (1991) with them the following year. The album became a breakthrough achievement and to date has sold over 30 million copies worldwide. In Utero (1993), their third and final studio album, was released just months prior to the death of Cobain. Since then, a multitude of posthumous releases featuring Grohl have been issued, including MTV Unplugged in New York (1994), From the Muddy Banks of the Wishkah (1996), With the Lights Out (2004), and Live at Reading (2009).

Throughout his tenure with Scream and Nirvana, Grohl worked on crafting material of his own. Using the pseudonym Late!, Grohl released the album Pocketwatch (1992), on which he performed all instruments and vocals. This recording method was adopted three years later with Foo Fighters (1995), another album performed entirely by Grohl. After acquiring band members to help support the release, Foo Fighters quickly transformed into a group fronted by Grohl. The band has gone on to release a total of ten studio albums and three EPs to date, in addition to the live album Skin and Bones (2006) and their career spanning Greatest Hits (2009). As of 2015, Foo Fighters have sold over 12 million albums in the U.S.

Grohl appeared as drummer of The Backbeat Band, who recorded music for the film Backbeat (1994). Although recorded in 1990, Harlingtox A.D. would mark Grohl's only appearance as a bassist, with the release of Harlingtox Angel Divine (1996). He appeared for the first time as David Grohl, credited for the music to the film Touch (1997), which also included the resurrection of his former moniker Late! on select tracks. In 2000, Grohl began work on the heavy metal side project Probot (2004), writing and performing the majority of the music himself. While remaining active with Foo Fighters, Grohl has also contributed to an assortment of releases by other artists, ranging from solo acts such as Tony Iommi, David Bowie, Slash, and Michael Jackson to rock groups including Tenacious D, Queens of the Stone Age, Killing Joke, and Nine Inch Nails, among many others (see also: collaborations). Grohl contributed the track "Vile" to the soundtrack of the documentary film Rising Sun: The Legend of Skateboarder Christian Hosoi (2006).

In 2009, along with Josh Homme and John Paul Jones, he joined supergroup Them Crooked Vultures as the drummer and released the bands' self-titled debut.

Releases

with Mission Impossible
 Alive & Kicking (1985), WGNS Recordings – "I Can Only Try"
 77 KK (1985), 77 KK Records – "Life Already Drawn"
 Getting Shit for Growing Up Different (1986), Dischord Records/Sammich Records

with Dain Bramage
 Demo 1 (1986), No Label
 Demo 2 (1986), No Label
 I Scream Not Coming Down (1986), Fartblossom Enterprizes

with Scream

 No More Censorship (1988), RAS Records
 Live at Van Hall in Amsterdam (1988), Konkurrel Records
 Your Choice Live Series Vol.10 (1990), Your Choice Records
 Fumble (Recorded 1989 / Released 1993), Dischord Records

with Nirvana

 Nevermind (1991), DGC
 Hormoaning (1992), DGC/Geffen
 Incesticide (1992), Sub Pop/DGC
 In Utero (1993), DGC/Geffen
 MTV Unplugged in New York (1994), DGC/Geffen
 Singles (1996), DGC/Geffen
 From the Muddy Banks of the Wishkah (1996), DGC/Geffen
 Nirvana (2002), DGC/Geffen
 With the Lights Out (2004), DGC/Geffen/Universal
 Sliver: The Best of the Box (2005), DGC/Geffen/Universal
 Live at Reading (2009), Geffen
 Icon (2010), Universal

with Late!
 Pocketwatch (1992), Simple Machines
 Touch Motion Picture soundtrack (on select tracks)

with Foo Fighters

 Foo Fighters (1995), Roswell/Capitol
 The Colour and the Shape (1997), Roswell/Capitol
 There Is Nothing Left to Lose (1999), RCA
 One by One (2002), RCA
 In Your Honor (2005), RCA
 Five Songs and a Cover (2005), RCA
 Skin and Bones (2006), RCA
 Echoes, Silence, Patience & Grace (2007), RCA
 Greatest Hits (2009), RCA
 Wasting Light (2011), RCA
 Medium Rare (2011), Roswell/RCA
 Sonic Highways (2014), RCA
 Concrete and Gold (2017), RCA
 Medicine at Midnight (2021), RCA

with Harlingtox A.D.
 Harlingtox Angel Divine (1996), Laundry Room Records

with Tenacious D
 Tenacious D (2001), Epic Records
 Pick of Destiny (2006), Epic Records
 Rize of the Fenix (2012), Columbia Records
 Post-Apocalypto (2018), Columbia Records

with Queens of the Stone Age
 Songs for the Deaf (2002), Interscope Records
 ...Like Clockwork (2013), Matador Records

with Probot
 Probot (2004), Southern Lord/Roswell

with Them Crooked Vultures

 Them Crooked Vultures (2009), DGC/Interscope

with Dee Gees
 Hail Satin (2021), RCA

with Dream Widow
 Dream Widow (2022), Roswell Records

Solo career
 Play (2018)

Soundtracks

With The Backbeat Band
 Backbeat Music from the Motion Picture (1994), Virgin Records

With Tenacious D

 The Pick of Destiny Soundtrack to the film Tenacious D in The Pick of Destiny (2006), Epic Records

As David/Dave Grohl
 Touch Music from the Motion Picture (1997), Roswell/Capitol
 Rising Sun: The Legend of Skateboarder Christian Hosoi Soundtrack (2006), Image Entertainment
 Sound City: Real to Reel Soundtrack (2013), Variance Films/Roswell Films/Gravitas Ventures

Collaborations
The following is a list of artists whose releases feature contributions from Dave Grohl.

Singles
The following is a list of singles that include Dave Grohl as an official band member.

With Scream
 "Mardi Gras"/"Land Torn Down" (1990)

With Nirvana
 "Smells Like Teen Spirit" (1991)
 "Come as You Are" (1992)
 "On a Plain" (1992) promotional single
 "Lithium" (1992)
 "In Bloom" (1992)
 "Molly's Lips" (1992) promotional single
 "Puss"/"Oh, the Guilt" (1993) split single w/ The Jesus Lizard
 "Heart-Shaped Box" (1993) see also: "Marigold"
 "All Apologies"/"Rape Me" (1993)
 "Pennyroyal Tea" (1994) discontinued
 "About a Girl" (1994)
 "The Man Who Sold the World" (1994) promotional single
 "Where Did You Sleep Last Night" (1994) promotional single
 "Lake of Fire" (1994) promotional single
 "Aneurysm" (1996) promotional single
 "Drain You" (1996) promotional single
 "You Know You're Right" (2002)

With The Backbeat Band
 "Money" (1994)
 "Please Mr. Postman" (1994)

With Foo Fighters
 "Exhausted" (1995) promotional single
 "This Is a Call" (1995)
 "I'll Stick Around" (1995)
 "For All the Cows" (1995)
 "Big Me" (1996)
 "Alone+Easy Target" (1996) promotional single
 "Monkey Wrench" (1997)
 "Everlong" (1997)
 "My Hero" (1998)
 "Walking After You" (1998)
 "Baker Street" (1998) promotional single
 "Learn to Fly" (1999)
 "Stacked Actors" (2000)
 "Generator" (2000)
 "Breakout" (2000)
 "Next Year" (2000)
 "The One" (2002)
 "All My Life" (2002)
 "Times Like These" (2003)
 "Low" (2003)
 "Have It All" (2003)
 "Darling Nikki" (2003) promotional single
 "Best of You" (2005)
 "DOA" (2005)
 "Resolve" (2005)
 "No Way Back/Cold Day in the Sun" (2006)
 "Miracle" (2006) promotional single
 "Virginia Moon" (2006) promotional single

With Foo Fighters (continued)
 "The Pretender" (2007)
 "Long Road to Ruin" (2007)
 "Cheer Up Boys (Your Make Up Is Running)" (2008)
 "Let It Die" (2008)
 "Keep the Car Running" (2008) promotional single
 "Summer's End" (2008) promotional single
 "Wheels" (2009)
 "Word Forward" (2010) promotional single
 "Rope" (2011)
 "White Limo" (2011) promotional single
 "Walk" (2011)
 "Arlandria" (2011)
 "These Days" (2011)
 "Bridge Burning" (2012)
 "Something from Nothing (2014)
 "The Feast and the Famine" (2014)
 "Congregation" (2014)
 "What Did I Do? / God As My Witness" (2014)
 "Outside" (2015)
 "Saint Cecilia" (2015)
 "Run" (2017)
 "The Sky Is a Neighborhood" (2017)
 "The Line" (2018)
 "Shame Shame" (2020)
 "No Son of Mine" (2020)
 "Waiting on a War" (2021)
 "Making a Fire" (2021)

With Queens of the Stone Age
 "No One Knows" (2002)
 "Go with the Flow" (2003)
 "First It Giveth" (2003)
 "My God Is the Sun" (2013)

As Probot
 "Centuries of Sin"/"The Emerald Law" (2003)

With Them Crooked Vultures
 "New Fang" (2009)
 "Mind Eraser, No Chaser" (2009)

With BBC Music (various artists)
 "God Only Knows" (charity single) (2014)

Solo
 "Play" (2018)

With Live Lounge Allstars
 "Times Like These" (charity single) (2020)

With Liam Gallagher
"Everything's Electric" (co-wrote and plays drums) (2022)

Production
The following releases were produced or co-produced by Dave Grohl.

I  Co-produced by Dave Grohl and Buzz Osborne.
II  Co-produced by Dave Grohl and Barrett Jones.

Videography

With Nirvana
 Live! Tonight! Sold Out!! (1994) DGC
 Classic Albums: Nirvana – Nevermind (2005) Eagle Vision
 MTV Unplugged in New York (2007) DGC
 Live at Reading (2009) Geffen
 Live at the Paramount (2011) DGC
 Live and Loud (2013) DGC

With Foo Fighters
 Everywhere but Home (2003) Roswell/RCA
 Skin and Bones (2006) RCA
 Skin and Bones & Live in Hyde Park (2006) RCA
 Live at Wembley Stadium (2008) RCA
 Foo Fighters: Back and Forth (2011) RCA
 Foo Fighters: Sonic Highways (2014) RCA

As David/Dave Grohl

 Sound City (2013) Variance Films/Roswell Films/Gravitas Ventures

References

External links
 Dave Grohl Band Discography (Infographic) by UpVenue

Discography
Discographies of American artists
Rock music discographies